The Ministry of Environment, Forestry and Tourism (MEFT) is a government ministry of Namibia, with headquarters in Windhoek. It was created at Namibian independence in 1990 as Ministry of Wildlife, Conservation and Tourism. The first Namibian environment and tourism minister was Niko Bessinger, the  minister is Pohamba Shifeta.

Mandate 

The ministries self-declared mission is "to promote biodiversity conservation in the Namibian environment through the sustainable utilization of natural resources and tourism development for the maximum social and economic benefit of its citizens." Its mandate is derived from the Constitution of Namibia, specifically Chapter 11 "Principles of State Policy" and Article 95 "Promotion of the Welfare of the People".

Namibia is the first African country that has integrated environmental conservation in the national constitution.

Structure 
The ministry has three departments:

 Tourism, Planning and Administration
 Natural Resources Management
 Environmental Affairs and Forestry

It further consists of seven directorates:

 Wildlife and National Parks (DWNP)
 Directorate of Forestry (DoF)
 Environmental Affairs (EA)
 Planning and Technical Services
 Scientific Services
 Tourism and Gaming
 Administration, Finance and Human Resources

Ministers
All environment and tourism ministers in chronological order are:

See also
 List of national parks of Namibia
 Protected areas of Namibia

References

External links
 Official website Ministry of Environment, Forestry and Tourism
 Ministry of Environment, Forestry and Tourism at the Commonwealth of Nations

Environment and tourism
Environment and tourism ministers of Namibia
Namibia
Namibia
Tourism in Namibia
Environment of Namibia
1990 establishments in Namibia